Watterson Park is a home rule-class city in Jefferson County, Kentucky, United States. The population was 976 at the 2010 census.

Geography
Watterson Park is located in central Jefferson County at  (38.194819, -85.689506). Interstate 264 runs just north of the city limits, while Newburg Road forms the northeast border and Poplar Level Road (Kentucky Route 864) forms parts of the southwest border. Watterson Park is bordered to the east by West Buechel, and Poplar Hills touches a small length of the southwest boundary.

Demographics

At the 2000 census there were 953 people in 504 households, including 252 families, in the city. The racial makeup of the city was 78.38% White, 16.68% African American, 0.42% Native American, 1.47% Asian, 0.42% from other races, and 2.62% from two or more races. Hispanic or Latino of any race were 0.63%.

Of the 504 households 16.5% had children under the age of 18 living with them, 32.9% were married couples living together, 10.9% had a female householder with no husband present, and 50.0% were non-families. 44.0% of households were one person and 17.7% were one person aged 65 or older. The average household size was 1.89 and the average family size was 2.55.

The age distribution was 14.8% under the age of 18, 7.6% from 18 to 24, 32.4% from 25 to 44, 24.7% from 45 to 64, and 20.6% 65 or older. The median age was 42 years. For every 100 females, there were 102.3 males. For every 100 females age 18 and over, there were 96.1 males.

The median household income was $25,417 and the median family income  was $34,917. Males had a median income of $30,500 versus $22,759 for females. The per capita income for the city was $18,933. About 7.5% of families and 14.0% of the population were below the poverty line, including 13.7% of those under age 18 and 9.7% of those age 65 or over.

References

External links
City of Watterson Park official website

Cities in Jefferson County, Kentucky
Cities in Kentucky
Louisville metropolitan area
Populated places established in 1981